The 2004 Utah State Aggies football team represented Utah State University as a member of the Sun Belt Conference in 2004 NCAA Division I-A football season. The Aggies were led by fifth-year head coach Mick Dennehy and played their home games in Romney Stadium in Logan, Utah.

Schedule

References

Utah State
Utah State Aggies football seasons
Utah State Aggies football